This is the progression of world record improvements in different age divisions of men's triple jump in Masters athletics.

Key

IAAF includes indoor marks in the record list since 2000, but WMA does not follow that practice.

Men 35

Men 40

Men 45

Men 50

Men 55

Men 60

Men 65

Men 70

Men 75

Men 80

Men 85

Men 90

References

 Masters Athletics Triple Jump list

Masters athletics world record progressions
Triple jump